MasterChef Australia is an Australian competitive cooking reality show based on the original British MasterChef. It is produced by Endemol Shine Australia and screens on Network 10. Restaurateur and chef Gary Mehigan, chef George Calombaris and food critic Matt Preston served as the show's main judges until 2019, when they were replaced by Series 4 winner and chef Andy Allen, food critic Melissa Leong, and restaurateur and chef Jock Zonfrillo.

The series has also spawned five spin-off series: Celebrity MasterChef Australia, which featured celebrity contestants, Junior MasterChef Australia, which featured younger contestants, MasterChef Australia All-Stars, which featured returning contestants from the first three series, MasterChef Australia: The Professionals, which featured professional chefs as contestants, and the upcoming MasterChef: Dessert Masters, which will feature pastry chefs.

Format

MasterChef Australia has a different format from that of the original British MasterChef and MasterChef Goes Large formats. Initial rounds consist of a large number of hopeful contestants from across Australia individually "auditioning" by presenting a food dish before the three judges in order to gain one of 50 semi-final places. Entrants must be over 18 years old and their main source of income cannot come from preparing and cooking fresh food in a professional environment.

The semi-finalists then compete in several challenges that test their food knowledge and preparation skills. In Season 1, the top 50 competed until 20 were left, with the final 20 progressing to the main stage of the show. From Season 2 onwards, 24 contestants progress. The contestants will then be whittled down through a number of individual and team-based cooking challenges and weekly elimination rounds until a winning MasterChef is crowned. The winner plays for a prize that includes chef training from leading professional chefs, the chance to have their own cookbook published, and A$250,000 in cash.

Episodes
MasterChef Australia airs five nights a week from Sunday to Thursday. Each night features a different episode format, however some episodes modify the format slightly. The typical episode formats are as follows:

Sunday is the Challenge night. From series 3, it can range from a variety of challenges, including a Mystery Box, where each contestant is given the same box of ingredients and are to create a dish using only those ingredients. The Judges then pick three dishes Based on Technique and Visual Appearance Alone and a winner chosen. There can also be an Invention Test, where contestants have to invent a dish relevant to a theme using a core ingredient. There can also be Off-Site Challenges and Team Challenges, which often involve cooking for large numbers of people. The top three contestants who made the best dishes are selected by the judges, from which a winner is chosen to compete in the Immunity Challenge. After this the bottom three are revealed, who will face off in an elimination challenge the next night. In the first two series, it would always consist of a Mystery Box, where the winner was able to choose the core ingredient for the Invention Test.

Monday episodes feature the Pressure Test. The bottom three from the previous night's challenge are given a recipe for a particular dish they are to emulate in an allocated time. Once completed they are taken in to the judges to be tasted, before all three contestants are seated in front of the judges for critiquing. The judges then eliminate the contestant out of the three that performed least adequately in the test.

Tuesday episodes feature the Immunity Challenge, where the winner of the Sunday challenge competes against a guest, which can vary from a chef, apprentice, or to a home cook in a cook off. The contestant is given the choice of two pantries of ingredients they can use, usually contrasting such as "Black" and "White". The contestant gets a head start to complete the dish before their opponent starts cooking and after the allotted time for both is finished, the dishes are presented to the judges for tasting and scoring out of ten. The judges are not aware which dish was made by which person, however. If the contestant's dish's score is equal to or higher than that of the guest, they are crowned the winner of the challenge. In the first series they are given a free pass to the finals week of the competition and can go home. From series 2 onwards, they receive a pin that allows them to save themselves from one future elimination.

Wednesday features a Team Challenge. The contestants are split into teams, and are given a task, and a set amount of time to complete the challenge. Tasks have included presenting a three course meal to a celebrity guest, running a restaurant for an evening or catering an event such as a birthday party or wedding. Once completed and judged the teams are given the results, which can be determined by which team the judges think did the best, or receiving the most votes or making the most money by the people the teams had to cook for, with members of the losing team facing an elimination the next night. The winning team safe from elimination receives a reward (for example lunch at a top restaurant).

Thursday is another Elimination. The two worst performing contestants from the losing team in the team challenge compete against each other in a head-to-head challenge to determine who will be eliminated. The loser of the challenge is then eliminated. On some occasions, all members of the losing team will be selected to compete as individuals in the elimination challenge. In the first series, a different elimination process was used. The contestants from the losing team were to vote for a contestant that they each feel did not perform to their best and may have cost them the challenge. After voting the team is called in together to announce the results of the vote, with the contestant with the most votes being eliminated from the competition. If the previous challenge was an individual challenge, the bottom two contestants competed in a head-to-head taste test where one contestant at a time named one ingredient of a particular dish or sauce, and the first person to name an incorrect ingredient is eliminated. MasterClass airs on Thursday following the elimination show and is generally limited to themed weeks. Here, judges George, Gary and Matt run a masterclass for the remaining contestants, which usually call back to some of the challenges from the previous week. For example, they may revisit the Mystery Box challenge and demonstrate some other dishes that could have been made or redo one of the contestants' dishes to give tips on how it could have been improved.

Back To Win Episodes
For series 12, the weekly format was modified to air a Team Challenge on Mondays, Pressure Tests on Tuesdays, Mystery Box on Wednesdays, Immunity Challenge on Thursdays and an All-In Elimination Challenge on Sundays. While an Immunity Pin was offered in the first challenge of the season, the Pins (as a regular weekly feature) were replaced with "Weekly Immunity", granting a contestant safety from the week's All-In Elimination, which involved all contestants except for one immune contestant. Immunity Challenges no longer involved competing against well-known chefs (hence there being no need for a mentor), and instead involved one or two challenge rounds which contestants progressed through to win Immunity. This format is also used in series 13.

Due to the COVID-19 pandemic in Australia, the format for Series 12 was changed again, to a three-day format from mid-June, in which the winners of the Mystery Box on Monday participated in the Immunity Challenge on Tuesday. The winner of the challenge was immune from Sunday's All-In Elimination. Pressure Tests and Team Challenges were discarded and only one contestant was eliminated each week.

Hosts and judges

Main series

(1) The main hosts and judges for the first 11 seasons, Gary Mehigan, George Calombaris and Matt Preston, were replaced after season 11 when broadcaster Ten failed to meet payrise demands set by the trio.

Spin-off series

Winners

Main series

Notes

Spin-off series

Series synopsis

Series 1: 2009

The first series of MasterChef Australia was broadcast between 27 April 2009 and 19 July 2009. Applications for contestants closed on 8 January 2009, with subsequent auditions held in Perth, Brisbane, Melbourne, Adelaide and Sydney. Over 7000 people auditioned for the show.

The Top 50 portion of the series was filmed at the Australian Technology Park in Sydney. From the Top 20 onwards, filming was moved to a studio on Doody Street in Alexandria, Sydney. The series one finale was filmed on 2 July 2009, two and a half weeks before its actual television broadcast.

The winner was I.T. office manager Julie Goodwin, who defeated Poh Ling Yeow.

Series 2: 2010

The second series of MasterChef Australia premiered on 19 April 2010, with the initial call for contestants held in mid-2009.

Other changes to Season 2 include not showing the initial auditions, with the series beginning instead with the Top 50 which were filmed at a Redfern Train Works building in Sydney, and having a Top 24 instead of a Top 20. Also, unlike Season 1, the last 45 minutes of the finale were broadcast live.

The winner was 31-year-old lawyer Adam Liaw who defeated Callum Hann.

Series 3: 2011

On 4 July 2010, Network Ten confirmed the return of MasterChef with new judge Matt Moran joining the original judges for series 3.

The series premiere aired on 1 May 2011. It was watched by 1.511 million viewers.

The winner was 36-year-old mother, Kate Bracks, who defeated Michael Weldon in the grand final.

Series 4: 2012

MasterChef Australia premiered Sunday 6 May on Network Ten. Regular judges, chefs George Calombaris and Gary Mehigan and food critic Matt Preston, returned for Season 4.

Andy Allen defeated Julia Taylor.
Audra Morrice came in third place.

Series 5: 2013

Network Ten confirmed in August 2012 that they have commissioned a fifth series for 2013. The program was filmed at the Melbourne Showgrounds in Ascot Vale, Victoria. Emma Dean won, with Lynton Tapp as the runner-up.

Series 5 featured a number of changes to the format including casting that focussed on contestant's personalities above cooking ability in response to the success of the Seven Network's rival cooking show My Kitchen Rules. The changes were not well received by both critics and audiences, and led to disappointing ratings compared to previous seasons. As a result of the show's poor audience response Network Ten cancelled all spin-off versions of Masterchef Australia as well as live events such as Masterchef Live in order to focus on "a new, fresh version in 2014 that will appeal to the loyal MasterChef fans as well as new viewers" according to Ten's chief programming officer, Beverley McGarvey.

Series 6: 2014

Network Ten confirmed in August 2013 that they had recommissioned the show for another series, which aired in 2014. The program was once again filmed in Ascot Vale, Victoria at the Melbourne Showgrounds. In addition to the return of all three judges, Kylie Kwong was a guest mentor who appeared during the immunity challenges. Heston Blumenthal and Marco Pierre White joined the show for a full week of challenges.

Brent Owens was the winner, with Laura Cassai taking second place.

Series 7: 2015

Shannon Bennett replaces Kwong as the regular in-house mentor for the immunity challenges. This season marked the return in stronger ratings for MasterChef Australia, with a series average of nearly 1.2 million metropolitan viewers. The finale (winner announced) was the highest rating non-sport TV event of 2015, with 2.2 million viewers (in metropolitan consolidated numbers). This series also attracted praise and critical acclaim from TV critics and writers, as well as many media personalities and many of the viewers.

It was won by Ballina restaurant manager Billie McKay. Georgia Barnes took second place.

Series 8: 2016

The eighth season premiered on 1 May 2016. It was won by Elena Duggan with Matt Sinclair as runner-up.

Series 9: 2017

The ninth season began on 1 May 2017. It was won by Diana Chan with Ben Ungermann as runner-up.

Series 10: 2018

The tenth season began on 7 May 2018. It was won by Sashi Cheliah with Ben Borsht as runner-up.

Sashi finished with a final score of 93 out of a possible 100.

Series 11: 2019

The eleventh season premiered on 29 April 2019. This season, former contestants Poh Ling Yeow, Billie McKay, and Matt Sinclair replace Shannon Bennett as in-house mentors. This is the final season to feature Gary Mehigan, George Calombaris and Matt Preston as the show's judges.

It was won by Larissa Takchi with Tessa Boersma as runner-up and Simon Toohey came in third place.

Series 12: 2020

The twelfth series, subtitled Back To Win, premiered on 13 April 2020.

In October 2019, it was announced that Jock Zonfrillo, Melissa Leong and season four winner Andy Allen would replace Mehigan, Calombaris and Preston as series judges. It was also announced that they would be joined by previous contestants who had returned to have another chance to win the title of "Masterchef" and the A$250,000 grand cash prize.

It was won by Emelia Jackson with Laura Sharrad as runner-up.

Series 13: 2021

The thirteenth series premiered on 19 April 2021.

It was won by Justin Narayan scoring 125 points with Pete Campbell as runner-up with 124 points and Kishwar Chowdhury in third place with 114 points.  Only one ending was filmed where in some previous years two endings were filmed.  This led to speculation that the winner had been leaked and influenced betting.

Series 14: 2022

The fourteenth series premiered on 18 April 2022. Subtitled Fans & Favourites, the season saw 12 new contestants go up against 12 former and returning MasterChef contestants including past winners Julie Goodwin, Billie McKay and Sashi Cheliah. It was won by McKay with Sarah Todd as runner-up.

Series 15: 2023
The fifteenth series, subtitled Secrets & Surprises, was announced at Paramount's and Network 10's upfronts in October 2022.

Spin-off editions

Celebrity MasterChef Australia

Series 1 (2009)

Celebrity MasterChef Australia, a spin-off featuring celebrities as contestants began production in early September 2009, and aired for ten weeks starting from 30 September 2009. The celebrity version, which features a heats and semi-finals format similar to MasterChef Goes Large, is based around weekly episodes.

Presenter Sarah Wilson did not return to present the show. Ten states that she was dropped because "the appropriate role for Sarah was not achievable without dramatically changing the format", but Gary Mehigan, George Calombaris and Matt Preston returned as judges, Calombaris and Mehigan took Wilson's presenting role. It was won by Olympic swimmer Eamon Sullivan, who took home $50,000 for charity Swim Survive Stay Alive.

In February 2010, executive producer Mark Fennessy stated that he doubted the spin-off would return for a second series.

Series 2 (2021)

On 25 May 2021, it was announced that a second edition of Celebrity MasterChef Australia had been commissioned, 12 years after the first edition had aired, it is set to air in late 2021. Andy Allen, Melissa Leong and Jock Zonfrillo will undertake the role of judges in the new season.

On 17 June 2021, Network Ten announced the 10 celebrity contestants competing on the second series of the show. Former AFL player Nick Riewoldt won the series, winning $100,000 for charity Maddie Riewoldt's Vision.

Junior MasterChef Australia

Series 1: 2010

Production of a junior version of the show was initially suggested in October 2009. The first series of the show, featuring 8- to 12-year-old contestants, was filmed after the second series of MasterChef Australia. Junior MasterChef Australia is produced by Shine Australia.

The series final was won by 12-year-old Isabella Bliss from Queensland.

Series 2: 2011

Ten confirmed a second series of the spin-off in their 2011 line-up. The winner was Greta Yaxley.

Series 3: 2020

On 27 April 2020, it was announced that a third season of Junior MasterChef Australia had been commissioned for late 2020, nine years after the second series aired. Casting was open to children aged between 9 and 14 years.

MasterChef Australia All-Stars: 2012

Ten began broadcast of a special all-stars version of the show on 26 July 2012 that aired during the 2012 Summer Olympics. It featured a number of returning contestants from the first three series, including series 1 and 3 winners Julie Goodwin and Kate Bracks, who revisited past challenges in order to raise money for charity.

It was won by series 2 runner-up Callum Hann, who ultimately raised $20,000 for Cancer Council Australia.

MasterChef Australia: The Professionals: 2013

A spin-off based the original BBC MasterChef: The Professionals series began airing on 20 January 2013. It featured 18 professional chefs competing against each other as opposed to amateur cooks. Matt Preston and chef Marco Pierre White hosted the spin-off.

MasterChef: Dessert Masters: 2023

A new spin-off, MasterChef: Dessert Masters, was announced at Paramount's and Network 10's upfronts in October 2022. The series will see pastry chefs from around Australia compete in the MasterChef kitchen for a $100,000 prize. The series will be hosted by Melissa Leong and international pastry chef Amaury Guichon.

Reception

Ratings
The one-hour series premiere of MasterChef Australia attracted an average of 1.42 million viewers, making it the most watched show in its timeslot. Ratings steadily grew throughout the first series, with the show dominating Australian ratings as it entered finals week, averaging around or above 2 million viewers an episode, and on daily rankings placing ahead of other high rating shows such as the Seven Network's Packed to the Rafters and Nine's Rugby League State of Origin broadcast. Its success is despite initial belief from critics that the series would be a dud based on the performance of previous prime time cooking shows, as well as general cynicism against a new reality show format.

The first series finale of MasterChef Australia attracted an average of 3,745,000 viewers, and peaked at 4.11 million viewers. This figure was for the last half-hour of the show, titled MasterChef Australia: The Winner Announced, while the first 90 minutes of the finale averaged 3,313,000 viewers. The figure also eclipsed the show's previous high, set on the last elimination episode, of 2.36 million viewers and also surpassed the previous high for a non-sporting event (Australian Idols 2004 finale, which averaged in 3.35 million) since OzTAM ratings started in 2001. It is currently the 4th highest rating television program in Australia since 2001, behind the 2005 Australian Open final between Lleyton Hewitt and Marat Safin, and the 2003 Rugby World Cup Final. Ten's share for the night was 41.3%, almost 20% ahead of its nearest rival. The first series finale was the most watched television program of 2009.

The highly anticipated second series premiere of the show attracted 1.69 million viewers, peaking at 2.11 million nationwide. In general, the second series rated higher on average compared to the first series, with weekday episodes seeing a 35% increase in viewers by the midpoint of the series. The last half-hour of the second series final attracted 3,962,000 viewers and 3,542,000 during the rest of the final out rating the series 1 final to become the 3rd highest rating show of all time.

Based on the number of viewers and the nightly ratings, Season 5 of Masterchef was considered the worst season, with the finale being ranked only the 5th most viewed television show that night, compared to every other season of Masterchef ranking #1. It is also the only season of the show to have under 1 million viewers of the finale, and it has received the lowest nightly rankings with several episodes below the top 20 in terms of most viewed shows. In total there were only half the number of viewers from Season 4. As a result of the show's poor audience response Network Ten cancelled all spin-off versions of Masterchef Australia (including: Junior Masterchef and Masterchef: The Professionals as well as live events such as Masterchef Live and Masterchef Dining) in order to focus on "a new, fresh version in 2014 that will appeal to the loyal MasterChef fans as well as new viewers" according to Ten's chief programming officer, Beverley McGarvey.

Main season ratings

Spin-off series ratings

Critical and popular reception
Despite success in ratings, the series initially received mixed reviews, with fans of the original British version describing the Australian show to be incomparable to that version in terms of quality, structure, judgement and skill of the contestant. Other commentators have also criticised the show for using a competition format similar to other reality shows such as Australian Idol, The Biggest Loser and Project Runway Australia that focuses more on the elimination of contestants than the food and cooking itself.  Ten's programming chief David Mott admitted that using the new format was "a huge risk", while FremantleMedia's Paul Franklin has asserted that "for a commercial audience we needed to pump it up and make it bigger, a little over the top, with more drama and storytelling and a sense of theatre".

Despite these harsh views, it is still popular amongst many others who have praised the balance of entertainment, skill and overall presentation which is more fun-loving in its (Australian) attitude in comparison with the original British format. The show has been described as "an antidote for cynicism" and a reflection of multicultural Australia, while the show's success has been attributed to audiences "uncomfortable with the win-at-all-cost mould of reality shows of old" and a shift in values in the face of the recent financial crisis. As is noted in MasterChef Australia's premiere episode of Season 4, since it premiered in 2009 (the first MasterChef series outside of the UK (est. 1990)), it has been such a success that France, Greece, Turkey, Portugal, New Zealand, India, Peru, Finland, Sweden, Italy, Germany, Denmark, Norway, the US and many other countries have all followed Australia's lead and formed their own series of the show in their respective countries; this in itself reveals the popularity of the Australian show from an international audience's perspective compared to that of the British version.

Cooking schools have reported an increase in enrolments due to the success of the series, while kitchenware retailers and upmarket restaurants have also seen increased trade. Supermarkets and specialty food retailers have reported increased demand from the public for more unusual ingredients, such as quail, custard apple and squab, after such were featured on the program. The success of the show led Ten to explore possible spin-offs such as the celebrity and junior versions, as well as one featuring professional chefs as contestants. The success of the show has also led competing networks to commission their own competitive cooking programs, such as Seven's My Kitchen Rules and Nine's The Great Aussie Cook-Off after the first series of the Australian version, with reports that both networks were planning more copycat shows to air in late 2010 and early 2011.

MasterChef Australia won the award for Most Popular Reality Program at the 2010 Logie Awards. In addition, Matt Preston won the Graham Kennedy Award for Most Outstanding New Talent for his work on the program.

Controversy
Allegations of vote rigging
Significant numbers of viewers have raised allegations that the voting on the series one finale of MasterChef was fraudulent after Julie Goodwin won the crown over Poh Ling Yeow. After the airing of the finale talkback radio became inundated with calls, both for and against the verdict, and the finale also became a top trending topic on social networking site Twitter, where many users said they felt "deflated" and "ripped off" by the final episode of the hit show. Similar allegations were raised when contestants were eliminated throughout the series.

Judge Matt Preston has denied that eliminations were rigged or the result of a popularity contest, and asserted that Julie had won the title because she was the better cook on the night. Goodwin herself has also asserted that her victory was not the result of rigging, insisting that the professional integrity of the three judges would be damaged if it were.

Welfare of former contestants
During their time playing MasterChef, the contestants are paid a retainer of $500 a week. This is slightly below the national Australian minimum wage of $589.30 and less than half the average wage of $1,291.34. However, contestants have their accommodation provided for the duration of their time in the competition, meaning they live rent-free. These facts were revealed in 2011 along with the knowledge that most contestants quit their jobs before entering the competition and faced seeking re-employment once eliminated from the show.

Marco Pierre White
Following comments made by judge Matt Preston about Marco Pierre White's son's admitted $500,000 splurge of his father's money on drugs and prostitution, White stopped making guest appearances on MasterChef Australia after the 8th season and joined the rival programme Hell's Kitchen Australia. In 2016, whilst on The Kyle and Jackie O Show, Preston was asked about Marco Jr.'s time on Big Brother UK, which included his alleged on–air sex and the above admission to purchasing illicit drugs and sex workers. Preston said "I think it is that terrible thing when you have kids that go off the rails... the drugs might be a little bit of a worry". This sparked a series of profanity–filled social media attacks by Marco Jr. which he has since apologised for. The senior White later said of Preston that "I will never forgive that man... with my hand on my mother’s grave I will get that man". White eventually returned to the program in season 14, after Preston had left the show.

International syndication

The network in bold''' also broadcast their own version of MasterChef.

Print publications
Official MasterChef Cookbook Volume 1
The Official MasterChef Cookbook Volume 1 was published by Random House Australia in December 2009. It contains recipes from the series 1 Top 20 contestants and top Australian and international chefs: Martin Boetz, Donovan Cooke, Pete Evans, Manu Feildel, Guy Grossi, Alex Herbert, Matt Moran and Andrew Honeysett, Ben O'Donoghue, Adrian Richardson, Frank Shek, Emmanuel Stroobant and Adriano Zumbo. There are also behind-the-scenes stories and culinary tips and tricks.

MasterChef MagazineMasterChef Magazine, a monthly spin-off publication adopting the series' brand, went on sale in May 2010. Following a high-profile launch, the magazine exceeded its initial sales target within a short period of time, selling 90,000 copies in three days. The magazine was published by News Magazines, a subsidiary of News Limited.
After losing a third of its readers in one year, the magazine was closed in October 2012

See also

MasterChef Australia contestants with television series
List of Australian television series

References

External links
MasterChef Australia – Official MasterChef Australia WebsiteOfficial Channel 10 Website – Official Network Ten Website (with free MasterChef episodes)Official Production Website – Official Shine Australia Production Website''

 
Network 10 original programming
2009 Australian television series debuts
2000s Australian reality television series
2010s Australian reality television series
2020s Australian reality television series
Australian cooking television series
Television shows filmed in Australia
Television series by Fremantle (company)
English-language television shows
Cooking competitions in Australia
Australian television series based on British television series
Reality competition television series